Blackledge may refer to:

People with the surname
 Benjamin Blackledge (c. 1760) U.S. educator
 Brett Blackledge, reporter
 Gary Blackledge, Northern Irish football player
Gina Cruz Blackledge (born 1969), Mexican politician, Senator from Baja California since 2018
 John Blackledge, English kickboxer
 Luke Blackledge (born 1990), English boxer 
 Ron Blackledge (born 1938), American football coach
 Todd Blackledge (born 1961), American football quarterback
 William Blackledge (died 1828), U.S. Congressman
 William Salter Blackledge (1793–1857), U.S. Congressman

Other uses
 Blackledge River, Connecticut
 Blackledge-Gair House, Historic Place, New Jersey
 Blackledge-Kearney House, Historic Place, New Jersey

See also